Protea denticulata, commonly known as the tooth-leaf sugarbush, is a shrub of the family Proteaceae native to South Africa. It can grow up to a meter tall.

References

External links

denticulata
Flora of the Cape Provinces